The Bronx County District Attorney is the elected district attorney for Bronx County, which is coterminous with the Borough of the Bronx, in New York City. The office is responsible for the prosecution of violations of New York state laws. (Federal law in the Bronx is prosecuted by the U.S. Attorney for the Southern District of New York). The current Bronx County District Attorney is Darcel Clark.

History
In a legislative act of February 12, 1796, New York State was divided into seven districts, each with an Assistant Attorney General, except for New York County, where Attorney General Josiah Ogden Hoffman prosecuted personally until 1801.

The First District included Kings, Queens, Richmond, Suffolk, and Westchester counties. At that time, Westchester also included present-day Bronx County, and Queens County included much of present-day Nassau County. The Assistant Attorney General was renamed District Attorney and New York County was added to the First District on April 4, 1801. Westchester was separated from the First District and became part of the Eleventh District with Rockland and Putnam counties on April 12, 1813, and New York County became the Twelfth District on March 24, 1815. By 1818, New York State had 13 districts, which were divided so that each of the 50 county then in existence became its own district on April 21, 1818.

Until 1822, the district attorney was appointed by the Council of Appointment, and held the office "during the Council's pleasure", meaning that there was no defined term of office. Under the provisions of the New York State Constitution of 1821, district attorneys were appointed to three-year terms by their County Court, and under the provisions of the Constitution of 1846, the office became elective by popular ballot for a three-year term beginning January 1 and ending December 31. Vacancies were filled by the Governor of New York until a successor was elected to a full term at the next annual election, and acting district attorneys were appointed by Courts of General Sessions pending the governor's action.

In 1874, New York City annexed the West Bronx into New York County. New York County was further expanded in 1895 to include all of today's New York and Bronx Counties. The Consolidation Charter of 1896 extended the term of incumbent district attorney John R. Fellows, who had been elected in 1893 to a three-year term from January 1, 1894 to December 31, 1896, by an extra year. Since the city elections of 1897, the New York and Bronx County District Attorneys' terms have coincided with the Mayor's terms and have been four years, except for 1901 to 1905, when two mayors served two-year terms. In case of a vacancy, a special election is held for the remainder of the term.

For the list of district attorneys for the area covering Bronx County prior to its creation from New York County, see Werner (p. 553, 554, and 563) for 1801 to 1874, both Werner (p. 563) and New York County District Attorney from 1874 to 1895, and New York County District Attorney for 1895 to 1913. When Bronx County was created on January 1, 1914, Francis W. Martin, who won the election in November 1913 in anticipation of its formation, became district attorney. His initial salary was $10,000.

List of Bronx County District Attorneys

References

External links
 official website

The Bronx
Bronx County District Attorneys
1914 establishments in New York City